James Jackson McAlester (October 1, 1842 – September 21, 1920) was an American Confederate Army soldier and merchant. McAlester was the founder of McAlester, Oklahoma as well as a primary developer of the coal mining industry in eastern Oklahoma. He served as the United States Marshal for Indian Territory (1893–1897), one of three members of the first Oklahoma Corporation Commission (1907–1911) and the second lieutenant governor of Oklahoma from 1911 to 1915.

Biography
McAlester was born in Sebastian County, Arkansas on October 1, 1842. He grew up in Ft. Smith, Arkansas. After the defeat of the Confederacy he returned to Ft. Smith where he met engineer Oliver Weldon who gave him details of the location of coal deposits in the Cross Roads area of Indian Territory (now the McAlester area of Oklahoma). In 1866 he went to the Choctaw Nation and worked as a trader to the Indians.

On August 22, 1872, he married Rebecca Burney (born 1841 in Mississippi - died May 5, 1919, in Oklahoma) a member of the Chickasaw Nation. This made it possible for him to gain citizenship in and the right to own property in both the Choctaw and Chickasaw nations. Using the knowledge he had gotten from Weldon, he was able to make many lucrative coal claims in the area and to establish what eventually became McAlester Coal Mining Co. His trading company, J. J. McAlester Mercantile Company, was the company store for the miners since much of their pay was issued in the form of scrip redeemable only at J. J. McAlester Mercantile.

McAlester House, J. J. McAlester's home in McAlester is on the National Register of Historic Places listings in Pittsburg County, Oklahoma.

As a member of the Democratic Party he was elected as Lieutenant Governor of Oklahoma with 118,544 votes (49.3%), winning a relatively narrow election against Republican Gilbert Dukes with 94,621 votes (39.4%), as the Socialist candidate John G. Wills had reached nearly 10%. Thereby he continued to establish a long line of Democratic office holders, which lasted until 1995. During his tenure McAlester had the occasion to serve as "acting governor of Oklahoma, during the absence of Governor Lee Cruce from the state, as evidenced by a pardon he issued in 1915 in the case of Sibenaler v. State (1915 OK CR 45).

He died on September 21, 1920 in McAlester.  Rebecca Burney predeceased him.  They had four children, including a set of twin girls, all born in Indian Territory.

Legacy
J. J. McAlester's store served as the basis for the store visited by U.S. Marshal Rooster Cogburn in the 1968 novel True Grit by Charles Portis (and the subsequent 1969 and 2010 feature film versions).

References

 

1842 births
1920 deaths
Politicians from Fort Smith, Arkansas
People from McAlester, Oklahoma
Confederate States Army officers
United States Marshals
Lieutenant Governors of Oklahoma
Corporation Commissioners of Oklahoma